The 2002 Honda Indy 300 was the seventeenth round of the 2002 CART World Series season, held on 27 October 2002 on the Surfers Paradise Street Circuit, Surfers Paradise, Queensland, Australia.

The race was marred by extremely wet conditions. The initial start resulted in a multi-car crash injuring Fernandez and Takagi. CART officials allowed teams to repair their cars or pull out backups. Postponing the race was not an option due to international travel logistics, as cars had to get to Fontana, California by Tuesday US time to allow for conversion to superspeedway configuration and the 500 mile oval race scheduled the following weekend, and logistics of the street course circuit, as organizers were contractually required to have the entire course cleared by the next morning. The race restarted on lap 3 with slightly improved conditions, but went back under yellow at lap 10 where it would remain until the race was called at lap 40.

Michael Andretti's team believed the race would be called once the race passed official race status of the full lap past the halfway point (35 laps plus one) of the original distance (70 laps, but the race was shortened to 50 laps by officials after the start crash), but officials instead waited until lap 40 to force each car to make two pit stops. This gave Domínguez his first career win in the slowest race in CART history. For 2003, rules were changed to allow the race to be called prior to halfway with only half points being awarded.  This rule was not implemented by IndyCar after the 2008 reunification.

Qualifying results

Race

Caution flags

Notes

 Average Speed 55.849 mph

External links
 Full Weekend Times & Results

Honda Indy 300
Honda Indy 300
Gold Coast Indy 300
October 2002 sports events in Australia